Modesto De Silvestro (born 21 June 1950) is an Italian skier. He competed in the Nordic combined event at the 1976 Winter Olympics.

References

External links
 

1950 births
Living people
Italian male Nordic combined skiers
Olympic Nordic combined skiers of Italy
Nordic combined skiers at the 1976 Winter Olympics
Place of birth missing (living people)